The 2010 Women's Basketball Invitational (WBI) was a single-elimination tournament of 16 National Collegiate Athletic Association (NCAA) Division I teams that did not participate in the 2010 NCAA Division I women's basketball tournament or 2010 Women's National Invitation Tournament. This was the inaugural edition of the WBI. In the championship game, the Appalachian State Mountaineers defeated the Memphis Tigers.

West Region

East Region
7 Morehead State hosted a first round game.

WBI Championship Game
The WBI Championship Game was hosted by Appalachian State.

References

Women's Basketball Invitational
Women's Basketball Invitational